Farm to Market Roads in Texas are owned and maintained by the Texas Department of Transportation (TxDOT).

FM 300

Farm to Market Road 300 (FM 300) is a  route in Hockley and Cochran counties.

FM 300 begins at an intersection with FM 1780 south of Whiteface and heads east through open plains. FM 300 continues east through plains for approximately  before entering the city of Levelland and curving to the northeast.

As it enters the city, the road becomes known as Clubview Drive. In Levelland, Clubview Drive intersects Avenue H; at this intersection, FM 300 enters from the west on Clubview Drive and exits to the north on Avenue H, while US 385 enters from the south on Avenue H and exits to the east on Clubview Drive.

FM 300 was first designated on June 15, 1945. It originally began at SH 51 in rural Terry County and went west, then north, passing through Sundown before traveling northwestward to Levelland and then east to SH 51. On February 24, 1953, the section that connected the route to SH 51 was transferred to FM 211. At the same time, the designation absorbed some of FM 402 and all of FM 847, and was extended southeast through the ghost town of Gomez to US 62. Then, on February 10, 1966, the portion of the route from US 62 to west of Levelland was transferred to FM 303, while all of FM 1634 was transferred to FM 300.

Junction list

FM 301

Farm to Market Road 301 (FM 301) is located in Hockley and Cochran counties.

FM 301 begins at an intersection with Cochran County Road 227. The highway runs through a largely rural area of the county and has an intersection with FM 1780 before entering Hockley County. The highway passes by many oil wells for the next . FM 301 runs through the town of Sundown, where it is known as Richardson Street, and intersects FM 303. After leaving Sundown, the highway returns to a rural route before ending at US 385.

FM 301 was designated on June 15, 1945, from FM 300 (now FM 303) in Sundown to the Cochran–Hockley county line. On March 20, 1946, FM 301 was extended  into Cochran County. On August 1, 1946, FM 301 was extended east to SH 51 (now US 385). On July 14, 1949, FM 301 was extended westward  to its current western terminus.

Junction list

FM 302

Farm to Market Road 302 (FM 302) is located in Lamb County. It runs from US 70 east of Earth northward 5 miles to a road intersection.

FM 302 was designated on June 11, 1945, from US 70 east of Earth northward  to Spring Lake School at what would be designated as FM 2901 on May 6, 1964. On December 3, 1953, FM 302 was extended northward  miles to a road intersection, its current terminus.

FM 303

Farm to Market Road 303 (FM 303) is a  route in the South Plains region. FM 303 runs from U.S. Route 180 between Seminole and Lamesa to FM 145 in southwest Castro County.

FM 303 begins at an intersection with U.S. Route 180 in southeastern Gaines County. The highway runs north to Loop where it intersects with SH 83. FM 303 continues traveling north and enters into Terry County. The highway begins an overlap with FM 213 about 2 miles south of Wellman. The two highways run through the town together, with FM 303 leaving that overlap and beginning an overlap with U.S. Route 62/U.S. Route 385. About 4 miles northeast of Wellman, FM 303 leaves its overlap with US 62/82 and travels to the north. The highway turns to the west at County Road 941 before turning back to the north at FM 402. FM 303 turns back to the west at FM 211 and turns back to the north at County Road 937 and enters Hockley County about 6 miles north of here.

In southern Hockley County, FM 303 runs through the town of Sundown where it intersects with FM 301. Approximately 7 miles north of Sundown, the highway has a brief overlap with FM 300. The next major intersection is at SH 114, where FM 303 has another overlap. The highway runs through rural areas of Hockley and Lamb counties before entering the town of Sudan, where it meets U.S. Route 84. FM 303 continues to run through rural areas before entering Castro County, where it ends at an intersection with FM 145.

FM 303 was designated on June 11, 1945, from US 84 in Sudan southward  miles to Beck. On January 27, 1948, FM 303 was extended south to FM 54. On February 25, 1949, FM 303 was extended north to US 70. On May 23, 1951, FM 303 was extended north  to the Lamb-Castro County Line. On January 29, 1954, FM 303 was extended north and east  to a road intersection at Dodd. On December 31, 1954, FM 303 was extended south to SH 290 (changed to SH 116 on March 31, 1955, and to part of SH 114 on December 14, 1977), replacing FM 2129. On February 10, 1966, FM 303 was extended south to US 180, replacing all of FM 1635, a section of FM 1634 (current concurrency with FM 300; all of FM 1634 replaced by rerouted FM 300), a section of FM 300, and all of FM 1312. On May 12, 1989, FM 303 was rerouted north over FM 3458 to FM 145, while the section from 2 miles west of Dodd to Dodd was renumbered as the new FM 3458, effectively causing the routes to swap places.

Junction list

FM 304

Farm to Market Road 304 (FM 304) is located in Angelina County. It runs from FM 2497 north of Diboll to Pine Valley.

FM 304 was designated on September 27, 1960, on the current route.

FM 304 (1945)

The original FM 304 was designated on July 14, 1945, from FM 54 in Spade north  to Hart Camp. On January 27, 1948, the road was extended to the Hockley County line. On December 16, 1948, the road was extended north of Hart Camp . On July 14, 1949, the road was extended to Spur 9 in Olton. On May 23, 1951, the road was extended to US 84 in Anton. The final change was on July 1, 1955, when FM 304 was extended to US 70 in Olton, replacing Spur 9. FM 304 was cancelled on October 24, 1958, and transferred to FM 168, although this did not take effect until 1959.

FM 305

Farm to Market Road 305 (FM 305) is located in Upton, Crockett, and Pecos counties. It runs from US 67 in McCamey to US 190.

FM 305 was designated on June 11, 1945, from US 290, 12 miles east of Bakersfield, to the Pecos River. On June 28, 1945, the road was extended north to the Upton County line. On August 28, 1949, the road was extended northwest to US 67 at McCamey. The final change was on December 15, 1977, when the section from US 290 to FM 1257 was transferred to US 190, along with FM 1257 itself.

FM 306

Farm to Market Road 306 (FM 306) is located in Comal County. The highway runs from US 281 northwest of Canyon Lake and travels in an eastern/southeastern direction to FM 1101 in New Braunfels.

The highway was extended  northwestward to Sattler on December 18, 1951. FM 306 was extended  northwestward on November 24, 1959. The highway was extended  to FM 484 on June 2, 1967, and then to Cranes Mill Road 13 days later, absorbing FM 3007. The highway was extended  westward to US 281 on September 28, 1977. On May 27, 2010, the road was extended east to FM 1101 (resulting in cancellation of the parallel FM 483), completing the road's current route.

Junction list

FM 306 (1945)

FM 306 was previously designated in Midland County on June 11, 1945, from US 80 (now I-20) in Midland north to the Martin County line. FM 306 was cancelled on April 30, 1947, and became a portion of SH 349.

FM 307

Farm to Market Road 307 (FM 307) is located in Midland County. It runs from I-20 to SH 137.

FM 307 was designated on June 11, 1945, from SH 158 east of Midland, east . On July 14, 1949, the road was extended east  to a road intersection. On February 27, 1990, the road was rerouted to run from Lamesa Road in Midland east to SH 137. On June 27, 1995, the section from Lamesa Road to I-20 was transferred to Urban Road 307 (UR 307). This section reverted to FM 307 with the elimination of the Urban Road system on November 15, 2018.

Junction list

FM 308

Farm to Market Road 308 (FM 308) is located in McLennan, Hill, and Ellis counties. It runs from FM 933 to US 77 in Milford, and then from US 77 northeast of Milford to FM 66 south of Maypearl, with a spur connection in Birome. There is a concurrency with US 77.

FM 308 was designated on June 18, 1945, from Mertens to Irene. On January 25, 1948, the road was extended to US 81 (now I-35) in Elm Mott, replacing FM 311 and FM 435. On January 26, 1948, the road was extended to SH 22, replacing Spur 56. On January 18, 1952, a spur connection to Birome was added. On June 24, 1952, a spur connection to Irene was added, replacing Spur 193. On November 19, 1953, the road was extended north to US 77 in Milford, replacing FM 1882. On November 1, 1956, the road was rerouted in Mertens; the old route was transferred to Spur 314. On March 24, 1958, the road was extended from US 77 to a road intersection, replacing FM 1386 and creating a concurrency with US 77. On September 27, 1960, the road was extended northwest to FM 66. On November 25, 1975, the road was extended southwest to FM 933. On November 7, 1980, the spur connection to Irene was transferred to FM 1604. On June 27, 1995, the section from FM 933 to I-35, was transferred to Urban Road 308 (UR 308). This section reverted to FM 308 with the elimination of the Urban Road system on November 15, 2018.

Junction list

FM 309

Farm to Market Road 309 (FM 309) is located in Hill County. The highway travels from SH 22 west of Hillsboro northwestward to FM 934.

FM 309 was designated on June 18, 1945, running from SH 22 to Woodbury. The highway was extended to FM 934 on January 24, 1955, completing the current route.

FM 310

Farm to Market Road 310 (FM 310) is located in Hill County. The highway begins at FM 933 near Aquilla Lake and travels northeastward to I-35 south of Hillsboro.

FM 310 was designated on June 18, 1945, running from US 81 (now I-35) southwestward to Aquilla. On November 21, 1956, the highway was extended  to FM 1244 in Aquilla. A spur connection in Aquilla was added on October 31, 1957. On March 28, 1985, FM 310 was rerouted along the Aquilla Dam over old FM 3370 with the section of road south of Aquilla Lake and the spur connection being transferred to new FM 3370.

FM 311

Farm to Market Road 311 (FM 311) is located in Comal County. The highway begins at SH 46 east of Bulverde and travels in a northwestern direction through the Smithson Valley region of Canyon Lake before ending at US 281 in Spring Branch.

The current FM 311 was designated in May 23, 1951, along the current route.

Junction list

FM 311 (1945)

The original FM 311 was designated on June 18, 1945, from Malone to Birome in Hill County. FM 311 was cancelled on January 25, 1948, and became a portion of FM 308.

FM 312

Farm to Market Road 312 (FM 312) is located in Wood County. The highway runs from FM 49 northward to SH 11 in Winnsboro.

FM 312 was designated on June 11, 1945, running from Winnsboro to East Point. The highway was extended to SH 154 on December 16, 1947. FM 312 was extended to FM 49 on November 20, 1951, completing the current route.

Junction list

FM 313

Farm to Market Road 313 (FM 313) is located in the city of Brownsville in Cameron County. The south–north route runs along Minnesota Avenue from SH 4 to SH 48.

FM 313 was designated on May 23, 1951, along the current route. On June 27, 1995, the entire route was redesignated Urban Road 313 (UR 313). The designation reverted to FM 313 with the elimination of the Urban Road system on November 15, 2018.

FM 313 (1945)

The original FM 313 was designated in Henderson County on June 11, 1945, from US 175 near LaRue to half a mile northeast of New York. It was extended to SH 31 near Brownsboro on October 25, 1947. FM 313 was cancelled on December 3, 1948, and became a portion of FM 314 (now FM 607).

FM 314

Farm to Market Road 314 (FM 314) is located in Van Zandt and Henderson counties. The highway begins at FM 315 south of Moore Station and travels northward to FM 16 in Van. Between Moore Station and Antioch, FM 314 crosses over the western tip of Lake Palestine.

FM 314 was designated on June 11, 1945, running from Brownsboro to Van via Edom. The highway was extended southward to Larue on December 3, 1948, absorbing FM 313. On November 20, 1951, FM 314 south of Brownsboro was rerouted to the east, with the old route numbered FM 607 on December 10, 1951. The highway was extended  southward to FM 315 on December 17, 1952, completing the current route.

Junction list

FM 315

Farm to Market Road 315 (FM 315) is located in Henderson, Anderson and Van Zandt counties. The highway begins at SH 155 in Palestine and travels northward to FM 279 west of Tyler. The highway crosses over Lake Palestine twice and runs parallel to the lake between FM 3506 and Chandler.

FM 315 was designated on June 11, 1945, running from Chandler northward to SH 64 (now FM 279). On October 29, 1948, the highway was extended southward to US 175 in Poynor, replacing FM 318. FM 315 was extended south to SH 155 near Palestine on July 14, 1949, absorbing FM 837 (which was reassigned to an extension of this road on May 23, 1951).

Junction list

FM 316

Farm to Market Road 316 (FM 316) is located in Van Zandt and Henderson counties. The highway runs from SH 198 in Payne Springs to SH 198 north of Eustace.

FM 316 was designated on June 11, 1945, running from Payne Springs to Eustace. The highway was extended southward from Payne Springs to SH 31 in Malakoff on October 25, 1947. The highway was extended north of Eustace to SH 198 at Phalba on July 14, 1949. The section of FM 316 from Payne Springs to SH 31 was transferred to FM 90 (now SH 198) and the section south of SH 31 was transferred to FM 2636 on October 30, 1961.

Junction list

FM 317

Farm to Market Road 317 (FM 317) is located in Henderson County. The highway runs from SH 31 in Athens eastward to FM 315 near Lake Palestine.

On October 25, 1947, FM 317 was extended  eastward to Leagueville. The highway was extended  eastward to FM 314 on November 25, 1956. On October 31, 1957, FM 317 was extended  eastward to FM 315. The highway was extended westward past SH 31 to another point on SH 31 west of Athens on January 31, 1979, creating a partial beltway around the town. This western extension of FM 317 became part of Loop 7 on January 28, 2005.

Junction list

FM 318

Farm to Market Road 318 (FM 318) is located in Lavaca County. It runs from US 77 south of Hallettsville, southwestward to FM 531, and from another point on FM 531 to SH 111 in Yoakum.

FM 318 was designated on May 23, 1951, to run from SH 111 in Yoakum northeast  to a road intersection. On November 21, 1956, the road was extended northeast to FM 531 in Sweet Home. In May 18, 1970, the road was extended northeast to US 77, replacing FM 2763 and completing its current route.

FM 318 (1945)

The original FM 318 was designated on June 11, 1945, from Poyner north to Fincastle in Henderson County. FM 318 was cancelled on October 29, 1948, and became a portion of FM 315.

FM 319

Farm to Market Road 319 (FM 319) is located in Anderson County. It runs from SH 294 in Elkhart southwest to Parker's Store.

FM 319 was designated on June 11, 1945, on the current route.

FM 320

Farm to Market Road 320 (FM 320) is located in Anderson County. It runs from US 79 at Palestine westward to FM 645.

FM 320 was designated on June 11, 1945, on the current route.

FM 321

Farm to Market Road 321 (FM 321) is located in Anderson County. It runs from FM 2574 in Neches westward to Yard.

FM 321 was designated on June 11, 1945, to run from SH 19 in Montalba west to US 287 (now Spur 324) in Tennessee Colony. On November 20, 1951, the road was extended west  to Cooks Store. On October 28, 1953, the road was extended west  to Yard. On June 28, 1963, the road was extended east to SH 155. On June 2, 1967, the road was extended east to FM 2267 in Neches. On September 26, 1967, the eastern terminus was redescribed as FM 2574 in Neches, completing its current route.

FM 322

Farm to Market Road 322 (FM 322) is located in Anderson County. It runs from US 287 in Palestine southward to FM 319.

FM 322 was designated on June 11, 1945, to run from US 287 in Palestine southward  over the Poor Farm Road. On December 10, 1946 (date of agreement January 13, 1947), the road was extended south . On July 14, 1949, the road was extended south  to SH 294. On May 2, 1962, the road was extended south to FM 319, completing its current route.

FM 323

Farm to Market Road 323 (FM 323) is located in Anderson County. It runs from US 84 southeast of Palestine southeast to SH 294.

FM 323 was designated on June 11, 1945, to run from US 84 southeast of Palestine southeastward . On May 23, 1951, the road was extended southeast  to Alderbranch. On October 28, 1953, the road was extended southeast  to SH 294.

FM 324

Farm to Market Road 324 (FM 324) is located in Angelina County. It runs from SH 94 in Lufkin south to US 59.

FM 324 was designated on June 11, 1945, to run from SH 94 in Lufkin south  along the Old Diboll Road. On January 13, 1946, the road was extended south  to US 59. On August 1, 1963, the road was extended south  to the new route of US 59.

FM 325

Farm to Market Road 325 (FM 325) is located in Angelina County. It runs from Business US 59 eastward to a road intersection.

FM 325 was designated on June 11, 1945, to run from US 59 (now Bus. US 59) in Lufkin east  along Ewing Road. On November 25, 1975, the road was extended east  to a road intersection.

FM 326

Farm to Market Road 326 (FM 326) is located in Angelina County. It runs from SH 103 east of Lufkin, south to US 69 in Homer, and from another point on US 69, southward via Bald Hill.

FM 326 was designated on June 11, 1945, to run from US 69 in Homer south . On October 31, 1958, the road was extended south  through Bald Hill. On January 8, 1977, the road was extended northward to SH 103, replacing sections of FM 2916 (which FM 1475 was rerouted over the remainder of) and FM 1475.

FM 327

Farm to Market Road 327 (FM 327) is located in Bexar County. It runs from Loop 1604 southwest via Elmendorf to another point on Loop 1604.

FM 327 was designated on March 3, 1981, on the current route. It is a former alignment of Loop 1604 in Elmendorf.

FM 327 (1945)

FM 327 was previously designated on June 11, 1945, from US 69 in Pollok southwest  to SH 103 in Angelina County. This designation was cancelled on July 24, 1961; the section from US 69 to FM 1819 was transferred to SH 7, while the section from FM 1819 to SH 103 became an extension of FM 1819.

FM 328

Farm to Market Road 328 (FM 328) is located in Angelina County. It runs from FM 2109 in Huntington northeastward.

FM 328 was designated on June 11, 1945, to run from US 69 in Huntington northeast . On March 23, 1954, a section was transferred to FM 1669 and the sections on Linn Street and Fifth Street were given to the city of Huntington.

FM 329

Farm to Market Road 329 (FM 329) is located in Ellis County. It runs from I-35E south of Waxahachie east to US 77.

FM 329 was designated on May 6, 1964, on the current route.

FM 329 (1945)

The original FM 329 was designated on June 11, 1945, from Concord north . FM 329 was cancelled on October 28, 1960, because of the relocation of SH 63 due to the construction of Sam Rayburn Reservoir.

FM 330

Farm to Market Road 330 (FM 330) is located in Sabine County. It runs from SH 21 in Geneva to SH 87 in Sexton.

FM 330 was designated on June 11, 1945, on the current route.

FM 331

Farm to Market Road 331 (FM 331) is located in Austin County. It runs from Oil Field Road near Raccoon Bend to SH 36 north of Sealy. There is a brief concurrency with FM 529 near Burleigh.

FM 331 was designated on June 16, 1945, from SH 159 at Bellville to Burleigh. On October 31, 1958, the road was extended to SH 36 southeast of Peters. The final change came on April 6, 1970, when FM 331 was rerouted; the original route was transferred to FM 529, and a section from Burleigh to Raccoon Bend was added, replacing FM 2916.

FM 332

Farm to Market Road 332 (FM 332) is located in Washington County. It runs from FM 389 southwest of Brenham to FM 2502 at Wesley.

FM 332 was designated on June 16, 1945, from SH 159 at Nelsonville to Welcome. On April 24, 1953, the road was extended to the Washington County Line. On May 11, 1953, the road was extended to FM 389, replacing FM 1263. The final change was on December 16, 1958, when the Wesley-Nelsonville section was transferred to FM 2502.

FM 333

Farm to Market Road 333 (FM 333) is located in Colorado County. It runs from SH 71 in Garwood southwest to a county road.

FM 333 was designated on June 13, 1945, to run from SH 71 southwest .

RM 334

Ranch to Market Road 334 (RM 334) is located in Real and Uvalde counties.

RM 334 was designated as Farm to Market Road 334 (FM 334) on June 11, 1945, from US 90 in Brackettville northeastward  toward Laguna. On November 13, 1946, the road extended northeast . On November 23, 1948, a second section from SH 55 in Laguna west to the Uvalde-Kinney county line was designated, creating a gap. The gap was closed on July 15, 1949, when the section from 12.3 miles northeast of US 90 east to the Uvalde-Kinney county line was designated. FM 334 was redesignated as RM 334 on October 17, 1959.

RM 335

Ranch to Market Road 335 (RM 335) is located in Real and Edwards counties. It originates at its intersection with SH 55 just north of Barksdale. The  road's northern terminus is at its intersection with SH 41.

RM 335 was designated on June 11, 1945, as Farm to Market Road 335 (FM 335) from the Edwards County line to Vance. On July 9, 1945, the road was extended south to SH 55 in Barksdale. On April 19, 1956, FM 335 was changed to RM 335 and was extended north to SH 41, replacing RM 2378.

RM 336

Ranch to Market Road 336 (RM 336) is located in Real County.

RM 336 begins at an intersection with US 83 just north of Leakey (near the Real County Rodeo Grounds). The  road travels north to terminate at an intersection with SH 41.

RM 336 was designated as Farm to Market Road 336 (FM 336) on June 11, 1945, from US 83, 0.8 mile north of Leakey, north 7.4 miles up the West Frio River. On December 17, 1952, the road was extended north to SH 41, replacing FM 1434. On October 1, 1956, FM 336 was changed to RM 336.

Junction listRM 337

FM 338Farm to Market Road 338 (FM 338) is located in Collingsworth County. It runs from a county road east, northeast, east, and southeast to the Oklahoma state line.

FM 330 was designated on June 11, 1945, from US 83 in Wellington west to Rolla. 12 days later, the road was extended southeast to Dodson. This extension was also part of SH 203 until September 26, 1945. On December 17, 1952, the road was extended east to the Oklahoma border. On October 28, 1953, the road was extended west  to a road intersection, completing its current route.

FM 339

FM 340

FM 340 (1945)

FM 340 was cancelled on December 17, 1947, and became a portion of FM 147.

FM 341

FM 342

FM 343

FM 344Farm to Market Road 344 (FM 344) is located in Smith County.

The western terminus of FM 344 is at  SH 155 in unincorporated Smith County, southwest of Noonday; the roadway continues to the west as  FM 2661. The route travels to the south and then east, through Teaselville and close to the Cherokee County line into Bullard, where it intersects  US 69. FM 344 continues to the northeast, to the community of Walnut Grove, before turning to the east and ending at  SH 110 northwest of Troup.

FM 344 was designated on June 11, 1945, between Eureka (now part of Teaselville) and Bullard. The route was extended to its eastern terminus at SH 110 on February 17, 1947, and to its western terminus at SH 155 on December 17, 1952. A realignment of the western terminus on February 15, 1971, established the current routing.

Junction list

FM 345

FM 346Farm to Market Road 346 (FM 346), is a  route in Cherokee and Smith counties. It runs from FM 855 in unincorporated Cherokee County at its western terminus to SH 110 in Troup at its eastern terminus. FM 346 was established from Whitehouse west  and from Whitehouse east  on June 11, 1945. On October 29, 1948, it extended west to U.S. Highway 69. On November 20, 1951, it extended west to FM 344. On December 17, 1952, it extended east to SH 110. It reached its current route on June 28, 1963, when it extended southwest to FM 855.

FM 347Farm to Market Road 347 (FM 347) is located in Cherokee County. It runs from US 69 in Jacksonville to US 84 in Oakland.

FM 347 was designated on June 11, 1945, from Troup to Jacksonville. The same day the road was extended south via Dialville to US 84. On February 20, 1946, the section from Jacksonville to US 84 was cancelled and redesignated as a state highway, although it was signed as an FM route. On June 9, 1947, a section along N. Bolton Street from Cherokee Street to E. Larrissa Street in Jacksonville was added. On May 21, 1953, the section designated as a state highway was changed back to an FM route. On October 27, 1953, the section from Troup to US 69 in Jacksonville was signed (but not designated) as SH 135. On November 5, 1971, the road was extended north 0.3 mile from US 79 to US 175. On August 29, 1990, the section from SH 110 in Troup to US 69 in Jacksonville was cancelled when the SH 135 designation became official. On December 18, 2003, by district request, the road was extended 3.4 miles to US 69 in Jacksonville, replacing a section of old US 175 and all of Spur 386. 

FM 348

FM 349Farm to Market Road 349 (FM 349) runs from Business U.S. Highway 259 and SH 31 in Kilgore east to SH 149 near Lakeport. FM 349 was originally designated on June 6, 1945, from Kilgore to the Gregg County Airport. It extended east to SH 149 on October 29, 1948.

Junction list

FM 350Farm to Market Road 350 (FM 350) is a  route in Polk County. It runs from FM 3126 in unincorporated Polk County at its western terminus (near the eastern shore of Lake Livingston) to US 59 (future I-69) in Moscow at its eastern terminus. FM 350 was established on June 11, 1945, from US 190 southwest . On October 29, 1953, it extended north . On October 13, 1954, it extended north to FM 1643 near Colita. On February 21, 1958, it extended east to US 59, replacing FM 1643. On June 2, 1967, it extended southwestward to FM 1988. On October 23, 1967, the section from FM 3126 to FM 1988 was transferred to FM 3126.

FM 350 passes by both the Livingston Municipal Airport and the Texas Department of Criminal Justice Polunsky Unit (the latter being the home of the state's death row for men).

FM 351Farm to Market Road 351 (FM 351) is located in Bee County. It runs from SH 202 west, north and east to US 181, forming a partial loop around Beeville.

FM 351 was designated on October 31, 1957, from US 181 (now US 181 Business) near the south city limit of Beeville, east to SH 202. On August 2, 1968, the road was extended west, north and east to US 181 north of Beeville, replacing FM 299. On February 26, 1986, a  section from US 181 northeast to US 59 was added, but this section was cancelled on December 21, 1987, bringing the highway to its final configuration.

FM 351 (1945)

The original FM 351 was designated on June 11, 1945, from US 190 near the Trinity River via Kickapoo to Onalaska. On November 21, 1956, the road was extended to the Trinity County Line. FM 351 was cancelled on December 13, 1956, and transferred to FM 356.

FM 352

FM 353

FM 354

FM 355

FM 356Farm to Market Road 356 (FM 356) is located in Trinity and Polk counties. It runs from SH 94 at Trinity southeast and south to US 190 near Onalaska.

FM 356 was designated on June 14, 1945, from Trinity southeast 5 miles. On November 23, 1948, the road was extended southeast to Sebastopol. On December 17, 1952, the road was extended southeast  to a road intersection. On November 21, 1956, the road was extended to the Polk County Line. On December 13, 1956, the road was extended to US 190 near the Trinity River, replacing FM 351. On March 31, 1970, a section of FM 356 from US 190 south  miles was transferred to FM 3186 and two underwater sections totaling  were cancelled. The final change was on April 24, 2003, when a segment of surplus right of way eroded by Lake Livingston (TxDOT no longer needed the segment) and a   mile section of FM 356 near the north shore of Lake Livingston were removed from the state highway system.

FM 357

FM 358

FM 359Farm to Market Road 359 (FM 359) is located in Fort Bend and Waller counties. It runs from US 90A east of Richmond to US 290/SH 6 east of Hempstead.

FM 359 was designated on June 18, 1945, from US 59, 1 mile east of Richmond, northwest to the Waller County line and from Richmond south to Thompsons. The same day the road was extended northwest through Brookshire to SH 6 southeast of Hempstead. This replaced part of SH 6. On September 26, 1945, the road was extended to US 290 at or near Hempstead. On August 1, 1947, the Thompsons-Richmond section was cancelled (it is now FM 762 and FM 2759). On December 15, 1982, the road was extended to the new location of US 290, bringing the highway to its final length.

FM 360Farm to Market Road 360 (FM 360)  is located in Fort Bend County. It runs from SH 36 in Needville to US 59/Loop 540 near Beasley.

FM 360 is a two-lane highway for its entire length. It begins at a traffic signal on SH 36 in Needville and proceeds along Main Street. After going  to the northwest, FM 360 comes to a traffic signal at FM 1236 (School Street). After entering the countryside, FM 360 continues straight to the northeast until it approaches the US 59 overpass southwest of Beasley. Near its terminus, the highway bends to the north and passes under US 59 (future I-69) before ending at Loop 540.

FM 360 was originally designated on June 18, 1945, from SH 36 in Needville and running  to the northeast to US 59. On March 29, 1953, a -long spur connection between FM 360 and SH 36 along School Street was added. On October 31, 1958, the spur connection was transferred to FM 1236.

Junction list

FM 361Farm to Market Road 361 (FM 361) is located in Fort Bend County. It runs from FM 1994 in Long Point to SH 36 near Pleak.

FM 361 was designated on June 18, 1945, from SH 36 south of Rosenberg to Fairchilds. On March 18, 1947, the road was extended to Long Point.

FM 362Farm to Market Road 362 (FM 362) is located in Grimes and Waller counties. It runs from SH 105 east of Navasota south to FM 1488 at Fields Store and from FM 1488 near the Harris County line south via Waller to FM 359 in Brookshire.

FM 362 was designated on June 18, 1945, from US 290 at Prairie View northeast to Joseph. On October 8, 1945, the description was changed so that FM 362 ran from US 290 near Waller  miles south toward Brookshire. The road was extended south  on December 16, 1948, and north to FM 1098 on September 15, 1949, replacing FM 1473. On May 23, 1951, the road was extended south to FM 359 in Brookshire, and north to the Grimes County Line on December 17, 1952, creating a concurrency with FM 1488 and replacing a portion of FM 1098. On June 15, 1954, the road was extended north to SH 6 near Navasota, replacing FM 245. On July 12, 1967, FM 362 was rerouted, replacing old FM 2988; the old route of FM 362 was renumbered FM 2988.

FM 363Farm to Market Road 363 (FM 363) is located in Newton County. It begins at an intersection with US 96 in north Kirbyville, just inside the city limits. The road travels east, roughly paralleling the Timber Rock Railroad to its south, and intersects SH 87 in Bleakwood. It intersects FM 2626 before reaching its eastern terminus at US 190 near the community of Bon Wier.

FM 363 was designated on June 13, 1945, from Bleakwood eastward to the junction with US 190. The western portion of the route, from US 96 to SH 87, was originally designated as SH 340 in 1941; that designation was cancelled and combined with FM 363 on September 26, 1945.

FM 364Farm to Market Road 364 (FM 364) is located in Jefferson County. Its southern terminus is at SH 124 on the southwestern side of Beaumont. Heading north along Major Drive, it first crosses I-10 and then US 90. Continuing north, it intersects SH 105 before reaching its northern terminus at Tram Road, which provides access to US 69/US 96/US 287.

FM 364 was designated on June 18, 1945, from SH 105 to SH 124. On August 24, 1955, FM 364 was extended  from SH 124, but this extension was cancelled on July 16, 1957. On October 15, 1976, the section of FM 364 from SH 105 southwest to FM 3120 was cancelled, and FM 364 was rerouted on its current route north to SH 105, replacing a portion of FM 3120. On June 9, 1983, FM 364 was extended north to Tram Road, replacing the remainder of FM 3120. On June 27, 1995, the entire route was transferred to Urban Road 364 (UR 364). The designation reverted to FM 364 with the elimination of the Urban Road system on November 15, 2018.

FM 365

FM 366

FM 367

FM 368

FM 369

FM 370

FM 371

FM 372Farm to Market Road 372 (FM 372) is located in Cooke County.

FM 372 was designated on June 23, 1945, from US 77 Gainesville southeast  toward Mountain Springs. On December 17, 1951, FM 372 was extended north  miles incorporating old US 77. On October 28, 1953, FM 372 was extended southeast  miles to a road intersection. On September 29, 1954, FM 372 was extended southeast  to FM 455. On November 23, 1959, US 82 was rerouted so that it was no longer concurrent with FM 372. On October 21, 1981,  miles were deleted after the construction of Lake Ray Roberts.

In its current configuration the road begins at an intersection with Interstate 35, continuing generally southeast into Gainesville before exiting the city to the southeast.  After passing through the rural communities of Burns City and Mountain Springs, the road continues southward until its intersection with Farm to Market Road 3002.  At that intersection the road physically continues as FM3002 in a southwestern direction while FM 372 continues southward until reaching the community of Broomfield where it ends and becomes a local road.

FM 373Farm to Market Road 373 (FM 373) is located in Cooke and Montague counties.

FM 373 runs from FM 922, near Rosston, to FM 677. FM 373 also runs through Muenster and Bulcher.

FM 373 was originally designated on June 23, 1945, from US 82 in Muenster north . On September 29, 1954, it extended north  to a road intersection. On February 15, 1959, FM 373 was extended  to FM 2382. On May 7, 1974, FM 373 was extended south  from FM 1630. On December 20, 1988, FM 373 was extended south  to FM 922 and north to FM 677, both in the same minute order.

FM 374Farm to Market Road 374 (FM 374) is located in Eastland and Callahan counties. It runs from SH 206 in Cross Plains to FM 569 in Pioneer.

FM 374 was designated on September 27, 1954, from FM 880 in Cross Plains east and south to SH 36 over a former routing of SH 36. The only change was on February 6, 1973, when the western terminus was redesignated as SH 206 and it was extended east to FM 569.

FM 374 (1945)

On May 23, 1951, FM 374 was extended northeast  to FM 1196 west of Archer City. On October 9, 1951, the highway was extended east to SH 25, replacing FM 1196. On October 28, 1953, the highway was extended southwest to the Young County line. FM 374 was cancelled on December 10, 1953, and transferred to FM 210.

FM 375Farm to Market Road 375 (FM 375) is located in Maverick County. It runs from US 277 east of Eagle Pass south to FM 1201 southeast of Eagle Pass.

FM 375 was designated on September 21, 1955, on the current route.

FM 375 (1945)

The original FM 375 was designated on June 19, 1945, from US 183 in Woodson to US 283 in Throckmorton County. FM 375 was cancelled on February 6, 1953, and transferred to FM 209.

FM 376

FM 377

FM 378

FM 379Farm to Market Road 379 (FM 379) is a designation that has been used three times. The current use is in Grimes County, from SH 105 in Navasota to Loop 508.

FM 379 was designated on May 23, 1958, from FM 1227 south of Navasota east to SH 6 (now Loop 508). On November 14, 1980, the road was extended over a section of FM 1227.

FM 379 (1945–1949)

The first use of the FM 379 designation was from US 83 north of Menard to the McCulloch County line. FM 379 was cancelled on July 21, 1949, and became a portion of FM 42 (now US 190).

FM 379/RM 379 (1951–1957)

The second use of the FM 379 designation was on May 23, 1951, from US 87 in Sterling City south  in Sterling County. The road was extended southwest   on December 17, 1952, and another  miles southwest on October 29, 1953. On October 26, 1954, a farm to market road from the end of FM 379 southward to the end of FM 2008 was designated. On November 23, 1954, the road was extended southwest  into Tom Green and Irion counties to US 67 in Barnhart, replacing FM 2008. On October 1, 1956, the designation was changed to RM 379. RM 379 was cancelled on September 27, 1957, and redesignated SH 163.

FM 380Farm to Market Road 380 (FM 380) is located in Tom Green and Concho counties. It runs from Loop 306 east to US 83 in Paint Rock.

 FM 380 was designated on June 11, 1945, as RM 380 from San Angelo to Paint Rock. This was SH 268 before 1939. On August 28, 1958, a section from San Angelo east  was replaced by a rerouted US 67. On November 13, 1959, the designation was changed to FM 380. On June 27, 1995, the section from US 67 east to Loop 306 was internally designated as UR 380, but this section was cancelled on November 21, 1996, by district request and transferred to Business US 67-J.

FM 381Farm to Market Road 381 (FM 381) is located in Runnels and Concho counties. It runs from US 87 north to US 67.

 FM 381 was designated on June 11, 1945, as RM 381 from US 87 to RM 380. On July 14, 1949, the road was extended north to US 67. On November 13, 1959, the designation was changed to FM 381.

FM 382

FM 383

FM 384

RM 385

 This road was FM 385 from June 11, 1945, to October 1, 1956.

RM 386

 This road was FM 386 from June 11, 1945, until November 13, 1959.

FM 387

FM 387 (1945)

The original FM 387 was designated on June 16, 1945, from US 87 at or near Sterling City northeast  in Sterling County. The road was extended to Edith on September 9, 1947, and to Loop 229 in Robert Lee on July 22, 1949. On November 24, 1959, a spur connection from near Loop 229 to SH 208 was added. On December 16, 1960, the spur connection became part of FM 387, while the main route itself was transferred to Loop 229. On January 12, 1969, FM 387 was rerouted due to the construction of the Robert Lee Reservoir; the old route was redesignated as FM 1904. On May 6, 1969, FM 387 was cancelled and transferred to SH 158, which it was already signed, but not designated, as.

FM 388Farm to Market Road 388 (FM 388) is located in Tom Green County.

FM 388 (1945–1948)

The first use of the FM 388 designation was in Washington County, from SH 36 south of Brenham via Muellersville to the Austin County line. FM 388 was cancelled on December 16, 1948, and combined with FM 109.

FM 388 (1951–1955)

The second use of the FM 388 designation was in Denton County, from SH 24 south through Lloyd to the former location of SH 24. FM 388 was cancelled on September 9, 1955, and transferred to FM 720.

FM 389Farm to Market Road 389 (FM 389) is located in Fayette, Austin and Washington counties. It runs from FM 954 via Shelby to BS 36-J in Brenham.

FM 389 was designated on June 11, 1945, from Brenham to Klump. On December 17, 1952, the road was extended to US 290 southwest of Burton and to SH 36 (now BS 36-J) in Brenham. On October 31, 1958, FM 389 was rerouted; the old route was transferred to FM 2502, while FM 389 was routed over the old route of FM 2502 to FM 1457. The final change came on September 5, 1973, when the road was extended to FM 954, replacing FM 3281.

FM 390Farm to Market Road 390 (FM 390) is located in northern Washington County.

FM 390 begins at U.S. Route 290 in Burton and intersects  SH 36 near Gay Hill before terminating at  SH 105 northeast of Brenham. The road has a spur route at Independence connecting to the ruins of the 19th Century campus of Baylor University and the University of Mary Hardin-Baylor. The road also passes through the former communities of Longpoint and William Penn.

FM 390 begins at US 290 in Burton and follows W. Washington Street northeastward to N. Main Street where it intersects Spur 125. FM 390 turns northwest along Main Street and then northeast along La Bahia Trail intersecting FM 1697 before leaving Burton. The route merges with FM 1948 moving southwest for less than half a mile before branching off to the northeast. The route intersects FM 2679 at Longpoint and then crosses under the Burlington Northern Santa Fe Railway at Gay Hill through a  single lane underpass, before intersecting SH 36. At Independence, FM 390's short spur route branches off to Old Baylor Park before FM 390 crosses FM 50. From Independence, the route passes to the east intersecting FM 2621 before reaching William Penn. The route then intersects FM 1935 and then turns south toward its terminus at SH 105.

FM 390 generally follows along a portion of the much older La Bahía Road from western Louisiana into southeast Texas used before European settlement. The road was extended by the Spanish to Goliad and used by American pioneers settling in Texas.

The first portion of the modern road to join the state's highway system was the section in Independence from Old Baylor Park to the present  FM 50 which, along with FM 50 south of that juncture, was first designated as  SH 211 sometime between 1933 and 1936. By 1939 that highway was decommissioned but reinstated in 1940. SH 211 was replaced by FM 50 and State Highway Spur 197 along the present FM 390 at Independence in 1943.

Two years before in Burton, State Highway Loop 125 was designated along the present  Spur 125 and the portion of the present FM 390 between Spur 125 and US 290. FM 390 was initially designated on June 11, 1945, from Loop 125 in Burton to SH 36 near Gay Hill. On September 26, 1945, FM 390 was extended over Loop 125 to US 290, and Loop 125 was shortened to its present spur. On October 26, 1954, the route was extended to FM 50 south of Independence and then from the junction of FM 50 and Spur 197 in Independence east to William Penn. The route at Independence was realigned on March 13, 1958, creating the route's spur and eliminating the route's concurrency with FM 50 south of town and replacing Spur 197. FM 390 was extended south of William Penn on November 5, 1971, to a portion of  SH 90 that would be renumbered as SH 105 in 1973.

In 1995, the Texas Legislature passed a law recognizing FM 390 as a scenic highway and directing TxDOT to erect route markers indicating the route number and the road's scenic status. In response, TxDOT erected along the route a shields unique among the state's Farm to Market Roads with a distinctive brown background resembling the shields of the state's Recreational Roads.

Junction list

FM Spur 390Farm to Market Spur 390 (FM Spur 390) is a short spur route of FM 390 at Independence that branches off of its parent route along Old Baylor Road to the west terminating at Old Baylor Park, the original location of Baylor University, chartered in 1845 by the Congress of the Republic of Texas and opened the following year, and the University of Mary Hardin Baylor, formerly Baylor University's women's department. Both colleges relocated to their current campuses in Waco and Belton respectively in 1886.

The spur was the northern terminus of SH 211 beginning between 1933 and 1936. SH 211 was decommissioned by 1939, but was reinstated in 1940. SH 211 was again decommissioned in 1942, and the spur became the western terminus of Spur 197. SS 197 was incorporated into FM 390 in 1958.

FM 391

FM 392

FM 392 (1945)

The original FM 392 was designated on June 22, 1945, in two sections: one section ran from Bremond to Nesbitt and the other section ran from Franklin to US 79 at Owensville. The sections were connected on November 23, 1948. FM 392 was cancelled on May 15, 1954, and combined with FM 46.

FM 393

FM 394Farm to Market Road 394 (FM 394) is located in Kerrville. The highway is known locally as Francisco Lemos Street.

FM 394 begins at an intersection with Loop 98 near Peterson Regional Medical Center and the Kerrville State Hospital. The highway crosses over the Guadalupe River before having an intersection with Water Street at a traffic signal. FM 394 travels another block before ending at an intersection with SH 27.

The current FM 394 was designated on July 11, 1968, along the current route.

FM 394 (1945)

The original FM 394 was designated on June 16, 1945, from La Pryor to Batesville as a replacement of a portion of SH 76. On July 15, 1949, the road was extended east . On February 21, 1950, the road was extended east  to US 81. On March 29, 1962, the road was extended southeast  to a county road. The section from US 81 southeast  was cancelled on November 23, 1962, in exchange for creating FM 2779; the remainder of FM 394 was cancelled on October 30, 1964, and transferred back to SH 76 (now US 57).

FM 395

FM 396Farm to Market Road 396 (FM 396) is located in Hidalgo County. It runs from the Anzalduas International Bridge north to US 83 Business.

On June 27, 1995, the route was transferred to Urban Road 396 (UR 396). On February 23, 2006, the road was extended south to connect to the proposed bridge, which opened to traffic on December 15, 2009. The designation of the route reverted to FM 396 with the elimination of the Urban Road system on November 15, 2018.

FM 396 (1945)

On July 20, 1948, a section from Wellman in Terry County to the Yoakum County line was added, creating a gap in the route. This gap was closed on May 23, 1951. FM 396 was cancelled on February 10, 1966, and combined with FM 213.

FM 397Farm to Market Road 397 (FM 397) is located in Taylor in Williamson County. The highway forms the northwestern section of a partial beltway around the town, running from US 79 to SH 95.

The current FM 397 was designated in 1978 along the current route.

FM 397 (1945)

The original FM 397 was designated on June 11, 1945, from US 84 northwest of Post to Pleasant Valley. FM 397 was cancelled on September 19, 1968, and combined with FM 399.

FM 398Farm to Market Road 398 (FM 398) is located in Collingsworth County. The highway begins at FM 338 east of Wellington and travels northward to SH 203. The road runs parallel to US 83 for its entire length, traveling about a mile east of that route.

The current FM 398 was designated in 1982 along the current route.

FM 398 (1945)

The original FM 398 was designated on June 11, 1945, from US 380 west of Post south to Graham Chapel in Garza County. FM 398 was cancelled on September 19, 1968, and combined with FM 399.

FM 399Farm to Market Road 399 (FM 399''') is located in Garza County. It runs from Pleasant Valley to US 380, and from US 380 to FM 1313 at Graham.

FM 399 was designated on June 11, 1945, from US 380 west of Post north to Close City. On November 20, 1951, the road was extended north to US 84. On September 19, 1968, the US 84-Pleasant Valley section and the US 380-FM 1313 sections were added, replacing FM 397 and FM 398 and creating a concurrency with US 380.

Junction list

Notes

References

+03
Farm to market roads 0300
Farm to Market Roads 0300